Nifenazone is a drug that has been used as an analgesic for a number of rheumatic conditions.

See also 
 Aminopyrine

References 

Pyrazolones
Nicotinamides